Bryan Pirouet (born 12 July 1949) is a former Australian rules footballer who played with Essendon in the Victorian Football League (VFL). After leaving Essendon, he played with Prahran in the Victorian Football Association (VFA), winning a premiership with them in 1973. Pirouet played for several country sides after his time in the VFA, captain-coaching Horsham Imperials, playing for Wonthaggi and captain-coaching Dalyston.

Notes

External links 
		

Essendon Football Club past player profile

Living people
1949 births
Australian rules footballers from Victoria (Australia)
Essendon Football Club players
Horsham Football Club players